The Chinese Ambassador to Namibia is the official representative of the People's Republic of China to the Republic of Namibia.

List of representatives

References 

 
Namibia
China